Muir Beach Overlook is part of the Golden Gate National Recreation Area.  People may visit this cliffside park when driving on State Route 1 (also known as Highway 1) north of San Francisco, California and south of Stinson Beach, California.  It has views of Pacific oceanside cliffs and on clear days you can see San Francisco.  You can also view migrating blue whales between November and June.

Location

History
Muir Beach Overlook contains several historic base-end stations. From these stations, soldiers viewed ships and triangulated the distance, speed, and direction of these ships in coordination with different stations.  These stations were mostly important for artillery units stationed on the coast to attack any invasion.  They gained particular importance during World War II immediately after the bombing of Pearl Harbor when many in California feared San Francisco or Los Angeles would be the next target.  With the advent of radar and its widespread use, these stations became obsolete.

A few of them remain open like ruins where you may enter them to get somewhat of a perspective of the soldiers who were therein stationed.

Pictures

External links
National Park Service: Muir Beach & Muir Beach Overlook

Footnotes

Landforms of Marin County, California
Golden Gate National Recreation Area
Headlands of California
Bay Area Ridge Trail